Eric D. Thomas (born September 3, 1970) is an American motivational speaker, author, consultant, and minister. Speeches by Thomas are popular on YouTube.

Early life
Thomas was born in Chicago, Illinois and raised in Detroit, Michigan. He was born to a single, teenage mother. After various arguments with his parents and aunts, he dropped out of high school and lived homeless on the streets of Detroit for two years.

While he was homeless, he met a preacher who inspired him to go back to school and eventually change lives.  He also  took a job at an Olive Garden on the westside of Detroit. Around this time, Thomas met his wife, De-De Mosley, at the Detroit Center Seventh-day Adventist Church. They then moved to Huntsville, Alabama, attended Oakwood University, and they were married as college students.

Thomas spent twelve years working toward an undergraduate degree at Oakwood and graduated in 2001.  While in Huntsville, Thomas preached and set up a program  to help underprivileged youth.

Career

Michigan State University
In 2003,  Thomas took a job with Michigan State University (MSU) along  with  a fellowship to attend MSU to complete his master's degree in K-12 Administration with an emphasis in Educational Leadership. He worked as an academic advisor to disadvantaged students at MSU.  At  MSU, he helped develop an undergraduate retention program called The Advantage with fellow academic advisor and motivational speaker DeAndre Carter which targeted academically high-risk Black and Latino students. He also served as senior pastor at A Place of Change Ministries (APOC Ministries) in Lansing, Michigan. Thomas attained a master's degree from MSU in 2005, and a PhD in Education Administration in 2015.

Motivational speaker
After becoming known as a preacher and motivational speaker, Thomas founded a company to offer education consulting, executive coaching and athletic development. Thomas has given motivational talks to collegiate and professional athletes. Thomas has appeared on Fox News to discuss his work, and portions of his sermons can be heard on the track "Intro" of deep house producers Disclosure's 2013 debut album, Settle, Hip-hop/R&B artist Foster's track "Hard Times" in 2016, and on the intro track "Wins and Losses" to rapper Meek Mill's 2017 album of the same name. In 2020, he reunited with Disclosure to speak on the song "Energy", which was released as the lead track from their third album Energy.

Books
The Secret to Success (2011)
Greatness Is Upon You: Laying the Foundation (Kindle Edition, 2014) 
Average Skill Phenomenal Will (2016)
You Ain't the Boss of Me (2019)
You Owe You (2022)

References

External links
Eric Thomas's Inspires Website
Eric Thomas's YouTube channel
Eric Thomas on Twitter
ET The Hip Hop Preacher on Facebook
Eric Thomas Chartwell Speakers Profile

Writers from Detroit
American motivational writers
American motivational speakers
Oakwood University alumni
Michigan State University alumni
African-American academics
African-American writers
African-American Christians
African-American businesspeople
21st-century American businesspeople
Living people
1970 births
21st-century African-American people
20th-century African-American people